South Park is a station on the Port Authority of Allegheny County's light rail network, located in Bethel Park, Pennsylvania. The street level stop is designed as a small commuter stop, serving area residents who walk to the train so they can be taken toward Downtown Pittsburgh.

History
This trolley operated on the route before it was converted to Light Rail operation. The rebuild car number has been removed at the request of a local family as this vehicle was involved in a fatal accident whilst operating on the 47 Drake route. However, it was later given the number 1729 (thought to be its original number), but this was later found to be in error and at some point the car may be renumbered to its actual original number of 1719.

References

External links 

Port Authority T Stations Listings
Station from South Park Road from Google Maps Street View

Port Authority of Allegheny County stations
Railway stations in the United States opened in 1987
Silver Line (Pittsburgh)